Machaeranthera asteroides, the fall tansyaster, is a North American species of plants in the sunflower family. It is native to the southwestern United States (California, Arizona, Nevada, New Mexico, Colorado, Utah) and northern Mexico (Chihuahua, Sonora, Baja California).

Machaeranthera asteroides is a biennial or perennial herb with a woody taproot.  It often grows in a clump of several stems. Ray florets in the flower heads are white or purple, and female. Disc florets are yellow and bisexual.

Varieties
 Machaeranthera asteroides var. asteroides - California, Arizona, Nevada, New Mexico, Chihuahua, Sonora
 Machaeranthera asteroides var. lagunensis (D.D.Keck) B.L.Turner Baja California; Laguna Mountains in San Diego County in California
 Machaeranthera asteroides var. glandulosa B.L.Turner - Arizona, Nevada, New Mexico, Utah

References

External links
photo of herbarium specimen at Missouri Botanical Garden, collected in New Mexico, isotype of Machaeranthera simplex 
photo of herbarium specimen at Missouri Botanical Garden, isolectotype of Machaeranthera canescens var. latifolia A. Gray (syn of Machaeranthera asteroides var. asteroides

Astereae
Flora of the Western United States
Plants described in 1848
Flora without expected TNC conservation status